The following is a list of Brisbane Lions leading goalkickers in each season of the Australian Football League and AFL Women's.

AFL

Multiple winners

AFL Women's

Multiple winners

See also

References

External links
Brisbane Lions Goalkicking Records

Goalkickers
Lions
Australian rules football-related lists